Foxes is the soundtrack to the 1980 film of the same name, starring Jodie Foster, Scott Baio, Sally Kellerman, Randy Quaid as well as The Runaways' lead singer Cherie Currie. The double-album was released on the disco label Casablanca Records.

Album information
Foxes was one of two soundtrack albums to be composed and produced by Moroder in 1980, the other being American Gigolo which included Blondie's American and British number one hit "Call Me".

The Foxes album contained contributions from some of the biggest names in pop and disco at the time, such as Donna Summer, Giorgio Moroder and Cher, as well as singer-songwriter Janis Ian and the Brooklyn Dreams. With the exception of two tracks by glam rock band Angel, the album was entirely produced and composed by Moroder and also included instrumental tracks which were performed by him and the same team of musicians as on contemporary albums by Donna Summer (Bad Girls), The Three Degrees (3D and New Dimensions) and Sparks (No. 1 in Heaven) as well as on previous soundtracks such as the Academy Award winning Midnight Express (1978): British drummer, songwriter and future record producer Keith Forsey and German keyboardist, composer and also future producer Harold Faltermeyer.

Singles
The biggest hit and best-known track from Foxes is Donna Summer's "On the Radio", released as a single in the autumn of 1979 (#5 Billboard Hot 100, #9 U.S. R&B and #8 on the U.S. Club Play charts). "On the Radio" was also used as the title track of Summer's greatest hits compilation On the Radio: Greatest Hits Volumes I & II which topped the American albums chart in late 1979. The On the Radio album included both the single version ( - 4:06) and a longer version ( - 5:50) of the track. The Foxes soundtrack added two further versions, an extended mix of Summer's vocal recording ( - 7:34) also issued as a promo 12" single, as well as an instrumental ballad version by composer Moroder himself.

Janis Ian's track "Fly Too High", with lyrics by Ian, proved to be another commercial success from the album in 1980, even earning Ian a Grammy nomination. The song became a hit in many countries, including South Africa, Belgium and the Netherlands. The track was later included on her album Night Rains which also contained a second collaboration with Moroder, "Day by Day".

Release
A handful of the recordings on the Foxes soundtrack have been reissued on various CD compilations over the years (Cher's "Bad Love" for example on the international two-disc edition of hits package The Very Best of Cher in 2003),

Foxes the soundtrack was release in Europe in 2012 on CD by Casablanca. Released 2012 Premium Series A.G  CD wasn't released in the United States.

Track listing

References

Albums produced by Giorgio Moroder
1980 soundtrack albums
Casablanca Records soundtracks
Drama film soundtracks